Pino Calvi (12 January 1930, in Voghera, Pavia – 4 January 1989, in Palazzina di Castana, Pavia) was an Italian pianist, arranger, conductor and soundtrack composer for films and TV series.

His song "Accarezzame" was performed by famous Italian artists such as, among others, Roberto Murolo, Ornella Vanoni, Peppino Di Capri, Achille Togliani, Teddy Reno, Fred Bongusto, Gigliola Cinquetti, Paolo Fresu.

He became popular in the 1970s for his participation in some RAI TV programs, such as Senza Rete in Naples, when he was a polite Maestro.

Gallery

Bibliography 
 Lorenzo Nosvelli - Angelo Vicini: Pino Calvi - Il sogno e la musica - Edo edizioni Oltrepò - 2003

References

External links 

 Pino Calvi Discography at Discogs
 

20th-century Italian composers
Italian classical composers
Italian male classical composers
Italian male conductors (music)
1930 births
1989 deaths
20th-century Italian conductors (music)
20th-century classical pianists
Italian male pianists
20th-century Italian male musicians